Happy Valley, California may refer to:

Happy Valley, Calaveras County, California
Happy Valley, Los Angeles County, California
Happy Valley, Plumas County, California
Happy Valley, Shasta County, California